Callington and St Dominic is an electoral division of Cornwall in the United Kingdom which returns one member to sit on Cornwall Council. It was created at the 2021 local elections, being formed from the former division of Callington and parts of the St Dominick, Harrowbarrow and Kelly Bray division. The current councillor is Andrew Long, a member of Mebyon Kernow.

Extent
Callington and St Dominic represents the town of Callington, the villages of Kelly Bray, St Dominic and Bohetherick, and the hamlets of Frogwell, Ashton and Burraton.

Election results

2021 election

References

Electoral divisions of Cornwall Council
Callington